Joinville-le-Pont is a commune in the southeastern suburbs of Paris, France.

History
The commune was created in 1791 under the name La Branche-du-Pont-de-Saint-Maur (literally "The Branch of Saint-Maur's Bridge") by detaching its territory from the commune of Saint-Maur-des-Fossés. The commune was renamed Joinville-le-Pont (literally "Joinville the Bridge") on 29 August 1831.  Under Louis-Philippe of France, the Redoute de Gravelle was built in the commune.

In 1929, the commune of Joinville-le-Pont lost more than a third of its territory when the city of Paris annexed the Bois de Vincennes, a part of which belonged to Joinville-le-Pont.

Geography

Climate

Joinville-le-Pont has a oceanic climate (Köppen climate classification Cfb).

Transport
Joinville-le-Pont is served by Joinville-le-Pont station on Paris RER line A.

Population

Education
Public schools include:
Preschools/nurseries (maternelles): Centre, Jean de la Fontaine, Polangis, P’tit Gibus
Elementaries: Palissy, Parangon, Polangis, and Eugène Voisin
Junior high schools (collèges): Jean Charcot and Jules Ferry

There is a private school, Groupe Scolaire A.P.E.P., which runs from preschool to senior high school/sixth-form college (''lycée).

See also
Communes of the Val-de-Marne department

References

External links

 Home page 

Communes of Val-de-Marne